Chazey-Bons is a commune in the Ain department in eastern France. On 1 January 2017, the former commune of Pugieu was merged into Chazey-Bons.

See also
Communes of the Ain department

References

Communes of Ain
Communes nouvelles of Ain
Populated places established in 2017
2017 establishments in France
Ain communes articles needing translation from French Wikipedia